Paternoster Square is an urban development, owned by the Mitsubishi Estate, next to St Paul's Cathedral in the City of London. The area, which takes its name from Paternoster Row, once centre of the London publishing trade, was devastated by aerial bombardment in The Blitz during World War II. It is now the location of the London Stock Exchange which relocated there from Threadneedle Street in 2004. It is also the location of investment banks such as Goldman Sachs, Merrill and Nomura Securities, and of fund manager Fidelity Investments. The square itself, i.e. the plaza, is privately owned public space. In 2004, Christopher Wren's 1669 Temple Bar Gate  was re-erected here as an entrance way to the plaza. 

The Square is near the top of a modest rise known as Ludgate Hill, the highest part of the City of London. It is characterised by its pedestrianisation and colonnades.

World War II bombing
The City of London was hit by one of the heaviest night raids of The Blitz on the night of 29 December 1940. Buildings on Paternoster Row, housing the publishing companies Simpkin & Marshall, Hutchinsons, Blackwood, Longman and Collins were destroyed. St Paul's Cathedral remained intact.

1960s rebuilding 
In 1956, the Corporation of London published Sir William Holford's proposals for redeveloping the precinct north of St Paul's Cathedral. Holford's report attempted to resolve problems of traffic flow in the vicinity of the cathedral, while protecting the cathedral's presence as a national monument on the highest ground of the City, at the top of Ludgate Hill, on the north bank of the River Thames. The report was controversial, however, because it introduced a decisively modern note alongside the foremost work of Britain's foremost 17th-century architect, Christopher Wren.

Rebuilding was carried out between 1961 and 1967, but it involved only part of Holford's concept — the area of Paternoster Square between St Paul's churchyard and Newgate Street — and this included undistinguished buildings by other architects and the omission of some of Holford's features. The new Paternoster Square soon became very unpopular, and (in the eyes of many) its grim presence immediately north of one of the capital's prime tourist attractions was seen as an embarrassment. Robert Finch, the Lord Mayor of London, wrote of it in The Guardian in 2004, that it was made up of "ghastly, monolithic constructions without definition or character".

1980s and 1990s 
In the late 1980s, many tenants moved to other London sites, resulting in a number of premises being left vacant. That prompted landlords and the City of London to welcome proposals to redevelop the area. In 1987, a body awarded a prize for a plan complex, bold, postmodern plan by Arup, but it was not implemented. In 1990, architect John Simpson developed a scheme, sponsored by a newspaper competition and championed by the Prince of Wales. It featured classically-inspired architecture, which would have been sympathetic with the nearby cathedral. More radical planners in the City criticised the plans as a pastiche, although though the scheme that was eventually constructed also drew heavily from classical architecture, complete with Corinthian columns and classical mouldings.

In 1996, permission was granted for a master plan by Sir William Whitfield, which was finally built. By October 2003, the redeveloped square was complete, lined with buildings by Whitfield's firm among others. Among the first new tenants was the London Stock Exchange.

Occupy London and public space controversy
The London Stock Exchange was the initial target for the protesters of Occupy London on 15 October 2011. Attempts to occupy Paternoster Square were thwarted by police, Police sealed off the entrance to Paternoster Square. A High Court injunction had been granted against public access to the square, defining it as private property. The square was repeatedly described as 'public space' in the plans for Paternoster Square, meaning the public is granted access but does not designate the square as a right of way under English law, thus the owner can limit access at any time.

Monuments and sculpture

The main monument in the redeveloped square is the 75 ft (23m) tall Paternoster Square Column. It is a Corinthian column of Portland stone topped by a gold leaf covered flaming copper urn, which is illuminated by fibre-optic lighting at night. The column was designed by William Whitfield's firm Whitfield Partners, and also serves as a ventilation shaft for a service road that runs beneath the square.

At the north end of the square is the bronze Paternoster (also known as Shepherd and Sheep) by Dame Elisabeth Frink. The statue was commissioned for the previous Paternoster Square complex in 1975, and was replaced on a new plinth following the redevelopment. Another sculpture in the square is Paternoster Vents by Thomas Heatherwick.

Temple Bar Gate, a Wren-designed stone archway constructed between 1669 and 1672 on Fleet Street at Temple Bar (the historic western ceremonial entrance to the City), has been in front of the cathedral side entrance since 2004. Contractors were paid £3,000,000 to restore it and move it from a site in Theobalds Park by the Corporation of London, which received donations from the Temple Bar Trust and more than one livery company.

References

External links

CWO construction of Paternoster Column

Redevelopment projects in London
Squares in the City of London
Odonyms referring to religion
Buildings and structures in the City of London
History of the City of London
Privately owned public spaces
William Whitfield (architect) buildings